Eleanor of Portugal (1328 – 30 October 1348), was a Portuguese infanta by birth and Queen of Aragon from 1347 to 1348 as the second wife of King Peter IV.

The youngest daughter of King Afonso IV of Portugal and Beatrice of Castile, Leonor was the granddaughter of King Denis and Elizabeth of Aragon and of Sancho IV of Castile and Maria de Molina and sister of King Peter I of Portugal.

Biography 

Little is known about her childhood. She is first mentioned when she was 18 years old when two kings vied for her hand in order to secure the support of Portugal: Alfonso XI of Castile  who wanted her for his nephew  Ferdinand of Aragon, and Peter IV of Aragon whom she finally married on 14 or 15 November 1347 in Barcelona, in the same year as the death of the king's first wife, Maria of Navarre. Eleanor was the first and only queen of Aragon who was born in Portugal.

She died on 29 October 1348, a year after her wedding, succumbing to the Black Death in Teruel while traveling to Jérica. Even though some authors assert that she had a daughter named Beatrice who died as an infant and was raised by her maternal grandmother, including Jerónimo de Zurita and Rui de Pina, there was no issue from the marriage of the Portuguese infanta and the king of Aragon.  She does not mention this child in her will who was mentioned in the two wills of her grandmother Queen Beatrice in 1357 and 1358 in which queen asked that the remains of the infant Beatrice, probably an illegitimate child of King Peter I of Portugal, originally buried at the Convent of Saint Francis in Santarém, were to be placed at her tomb.  
Queen Eleanor of Portugal was first buried in Jérica and in June 1350 her remains were transferred and buried in the Royal Pantheon of the Monastery of Poblet, as she had expressed in her will executed in September 1348.

Ancestors

References

Bibliography 
 
 

|-

1328 births
1348 deaths
14th-century deaths from plague (disease)
Portuguese infantas
Eleanor
Aragonese queen consorts
Countesses of Barcelona
Majorcan queens consort
14th-century Portuguese people
14th-century Spanish women
Burials at the Poblet Monastery
Daughters of kings